Novodnistrovsk is a city and municipality (Novodnistrovsk urban hromada) in Dnistrovskyi Raion, Chernivtsi Oblast (province) of Ukraine. Novodnistrovsk is located in the historical region of Bessarabia. Population:

History
An urban-type settlement was founded on 6 April 1973.

In January 1989 the population was 10 511 people.

City since July 1993.

Until 18 July 2020, Novodnistrovsk was designated as a city of oblast significance and did not belong to any raion. As part of the administrative reform of Ukraine, which reduced the number of raions of Chernivtsi Oblast to three, the city was merged into Dnistrovskyi Raion.

References

Cities in Chernivtsi Oblast
Populated places established in the Ukrainian Soviet Socialist Republic
Populated places established in 1973
Cities of regional significance in Ukraine
Populated places on the Dniester
Company towns in Ukraine
1973 establishments in Ukraine